Geodermatophilus daqingensis is a Gram-positive bacterium from the genus Geodermatophilus which has been isolated from soil which was with petroleum contaminated from Daqing in China.

References

External links
Type strain of Geodermatophilus daqingensis at BacDive -  the Bacterial Diversity Metadatabase

Bacteria described in 2017
Actinomycetia